Senator Stephenson may refer to:

Howard A. Stephenson (born 1950), Utah State Senate
Isaac Stephenson (1829–1918), U.S. Senator from Wisconsin
James W. Stephenson (1806–1838), Illinois State Senate
Samuel M. Stephenson (1831–1907), Michigan State Senate

See also
Senator Stevenson (disambiguation)